is a former Japanese football player and the currently manager J1 League club of Albirex Niigata.

Playing career
Matsuhashi was born in Tokyo on August 22, 1968. After graduating from high school, he joined Nissan Motors (later Yokohama Marinos) in 1989. Although he played as midfielder, he could not become a regular player. In 1996, he moved to newly was promoted to J1 League club, Kyoto Purple Sanga and he played many matches. In 1998, he moved to Japan Football League club Jatco (later Jatco TT). From 1999, the club joined new league Japan Football League. He retired end of 2001 season.

Managerial career
On 6 December 2021, Matsuhashi was announced as the successor to Albert Puig in the dugout for Albirex Niigata.On 23 October 2022, Matsuhashi brought his club to promotion to the J1 League next season as well as the J2 League champions for the 2022 season.

Club statistics

Managerial statistics

Honours

Manager
 Albirex Niigata
 J2 League Champions : 2022

References

External links

sports.geocities.jp

1968 births
Living people
Association football people from Tokyo
Japanese footballers
Japan Soccer League players
J1 League players
Japan Football League (1992–1998) players
Japan Football League players
Yokohama F. Marinos players
Kyoto Sanga FC players
Jatco SC players
J1 League managers
J2 League managers
Albirex Niigata managers
Association football midfielders